The R298 road is a regional road in Ireland linking the R297 road near Enniscrone with the N59, entirely in County Sligo.

See also
Roads in Ireland

References

Regional roads in the Republic of Ireland
Roads in County Sligo